Cheung Uk Tei is a village in Tai Po District, Hong Kong.

Administration
Cheung Uk Tei is a recognized village under the New Territories Small House Policy. It is one of the villages represented within the Tai Po Rural Committee. For electoral purposes, Cheung Uk Tei is part of the Tai Po Kau constituency, which is currently represented by Patrick Mo Ka-chun.

References

External links
 Delineation of area of existing village Cheung Uk Tei (Tai Po) for election of resident representative (2019 to 2022)

Villages in Tai Po District, Hong Kong